Anjanette Palencia Abayari (born July 20, 1970), known professionally as Anjanette Abayari is a Filipino actress and former beauty queen, known for portraying as the titular role in the 1994 film Mars Ravelo's Darna! Ang Pagbabalik.

Abayari was a former Bb. Pilipinas Universe title holder, but had to resign and give up her crown over the issue of her residency. She's also known for her roles in several films such as Pagbabalik ng Probinsyano, Tubusin Mo ang Bala ng Puso Ko, Azucena, Hindi Lahat ng Ahas Ay Nasa Gubat, and Halik ng Vampira.

Early career
After a few music video appearances, including her role as Timmy T's leading lady in the video of his hit song "One More Try", Abayari joined the 1991 Binibining Pilipinas competition and won the top title. However, due to her non-Filipino citizenship and residency issues, she was dethroned with the title given to Ma. Lourdes "Alou" Gonzales.

After her stint in the pageant, she flew back in the US and continued cheerleading for LA Raiders and did modelling and hosting for Lowrider Magazine Events. 1 year later, she came back to the Philippines to embark on her acting career. Among her notable movies were Pita, Terror ng Kaloocan in 1993, Darna! Ang Pagbabalik in 1994, Matang Agila in 1997, Pagbabalik ng Probinsyano in 1998.

Controversy
In October 1999, Abayari was intercepted at the airport in Guam for possession of illegal drug amphetamine, which she vehemently denied was hers. She explained that the ballpen the airport officials found in her makeup kit belonged to her sister. She didn't even realize what they were doing when they scraped it to find traces of shabu. Due to her American citizenship, she was declared persona non grata by then-president Joseph Estrada, in which she was cleared by the Bureau of Immigration in 2003. After a few months of being detained, she was released after paying bail of $9200. She returned to the United States to live a simple and peaceful life, while taking on different jobs.

Showbiz comeback
In 2013, Abayari staged her television comeback as a regular guest on The Dr. Tess Show.

In 2014, after 14 years, she briefly returned to the Philippines to visit her father. At the same time, she was interviewed by various TV shows.

Personal life
Her parents both hail from Iloilo with long time residence in the United States. She is the granddaughter of World War II veteran retired BGen. Alfonso P. Palencia.

She has two sons, Aiden and Ashton, both from different fathers. On March 2018, she was engaged to Evangelist Gary Pangan.

She runs a YouTube channel called "Anjanette Abayari Scriptures", which mainly focuses on Bible Studies.

Filmography

Film
1993 - Pita, Terror ng Kaloocan
1993 - Row 4: Baliktorians
1993 - Manchichiritchit
1993 - Astig
1993 - Dalawang Larawan ng Pagibig
1994 - Brat Pack
1994 - Mars Ravelo's Darna! Ang Pagbabalik
1994 - Ober da Bakod: The Movie
1994 - Talahib at Rosas
1994 - Ang Pagbabalik ni Pedro Penduko (Cameo) 
1995 - Silakbo
1995 - Batangueno Kabitenyo
1996 - Ang Syota Kong Balikbayan
1996 - Hindi Lahat ng Ahas ay Nasa Gubat
1996 - Tubusin Mo ng Bala ang Puso Ko
1996 - Hangga't May Hininga
1996 - Aringkingking: Ang Bodyguard Kong Sexy
1997 - Bandido
1997 - Matang Agila
1997 - Kadre
1997 - Halik ng Vampira
1998 - Pagbabalik ng Probinsyano
1998 - Gagawin Ko ang Lahat
1998 - Buenavista
1999 - Dibdiban ang Laban
2000 - Azucena
2017 - Without a Body

Television
1993-1995 - SST: Salo-Salo Together 
1995 - Halik Sa Pusod ng Gubat
1995 - Show & Tell
1998-1999 - Tropang Trumpo 
1999 - Beh Bote Nga
2013-2015 - The Dr. Tess Show

References

External links

1970 births
Living people
20th-century Filipino actresses
21st-century Filipino actresses
Binibining Pilipinas winners
Filipino film actresses
Filipino television actresses